Michelle Montgomery Pettit (born 1972) is an Assistant United States Attorney from California and is a former nominee to be a United States district judge of the United States District Court for the Southern District of California.

Education 

Pettit earned her Bachelor of Science, with distinction, from the United States Naval Academy, and her Juris Doctor from Vanderbilt University Law School, where she was inducted into the Order of the Coif and served as Managing Editor of the Vanderbilt Law Review.

Military service 

From 1994 to 2007, Pettit served in the United States Navy, being honorably discharged Lieutenant commander. Since 2007 she has served in the United States Navy Reserve, achieving the rank of Captain. During her career in the Navy and Reserves she has held multiple positions: From 2001 to 2004, she served as Assistant Legal Counsel, from 2004 to 2007, she served as Senior Trial Counsel and Command Services Department Head; from 2007 to 2010, she served as the Reserve Senior Trial Counsel; from 2010 to 2011, she served as a Reserve Appellate Defense Counsel; from 2011 to 2013, she served as the Reserve Executive Officer; from 2013 to 2015, she served as the Reserve Executive Officer and National Training Officer; then from 2015 to 2017, she served as a Reserve Appellate Judge; from 2017 to 2019 she served as Reserve Commanding officer and Chief Trial Judge.

Legal career 

Pettit served as Senior Trial Counsel for the United States Navy on Active Duty stationed in San Diego. Since 2015, Pettit has also served as a Judge in the United States Naval Reserves. She is currently an Assistant United States Attorney in the United States Attorney's Office for the Southern District of California, where she was a member of the National Security and Cybercrimes Section for eight years, and she is currently the Chief of the Intake Unit.

Expired nomination to district court 

On September 20, 2019, President Trump announced his intent to nominate Pettit to serve as a United States district judge for the United States District Court for the Southern District of California. On November 21, 2019, her nomination was sent to the Senate. President Trump nominated Pettit to the seat vacated by Judge Michael Anello, who took senior status on October 31, 2018. On January 3, 2020, her nomination was returned to the President under Rule XXXI, Paragraph 6 of the United States Senate. On February 13, 2020, her renomination was sent to the Senate. On January 3, 2021, her nomination was returned to the President under Rule XXXI, Paragraph 6 of the United States Senate.

References 

1972 births
Living people
21st-century American lawyers
Assistant United States Attorneys
Federalist Society members
People from Fredericksburg, Virginia
United States Naval Academy alumni
United States Navy officers
United States Navy reservists
Vanderbilt University Law School alumni
21st-century American women lawyers